Francisco Velarde de la Cuenca (died 1605) was a Roman Catholic prelate who served as Archbishop of Messina (1599–1605).

Biography
Francisco Velarde de la Cuenca was ordained a priest on 20 December 1578.
On 1 February 1599, he was appointed during the papacy of Pope Clement VIII as Archbishop of Messina.
On 14 February 1599, he was consecrated bishop by Ottaviano Paravicini, Cardinal-Priest of Sant'Alessio, with Leonard Abel, Titular Bishop of Sidon, and Giovanni Camerota, Bishop of Bova, serving as co-consecrators. 
He served as Archbishop of Messina until his death in 1605.

References

External links and additional sources
 (for Chronology of Bishops) 
 (for Chronology of Bishops) 

17th-century Italian Roman Catholic archbishops
Bishops appointed by Pope Clement VIII
1605 deaths